Franz Christian Gundlach (16 July 1926 – 23 July 2021) was a German photographer, gallery owner, collector, curator and founder. 

In 2000 Gundlach created the F.C. Gundlach Foundation, and since 2003 he has been founding director of the House of Photography at Deichtorhallen, in Hamburg.

Gundlach's fashion photographs of the 1950s, 1960s and 1970s, often integrating social phenomena and visual arts trends, are now found in museums and collections. Since 1975 he has curated many  photographic exhibitions. On the reopening of the House of Photography in April 2005, Gundlach curated a retrospective of Martin Munkácsi.

Gundlach also organized exhibitions from his own collections including A Clear Vision, The Heartbeat of Fashion and Maloney, Meyerowitz, Shore, Sternfeld: New Color Photography of the 1970s. He curated the exhibitions More Than Fashion for the Moscow House of Photography, and Vanity for the Kunsthalle Wien in 2011.

Biography

Fashion photographer 
F. C. Gundlach attended the Private Lehranstalt für Moderne Lichtbildkunst (Private School for Modern Photography) under Rolf W. Nehrdich in Kassel from 1946 to 1949. Subsequently, he began publishing theatre and film reports in magazines such as Deutsche Illustrierte, Stern, Quick and Revue as a freelance photographer.

Gundlach's specialization in fashion photography began in 1953 with his work for the Hamburg-based magazine Film und Frau, for which he photographed German fashion, Parisian haute couture and fur fashion campaigns. Additionally he photographed Romy Schneider, Hildegard Knef, Dieter Borsche and Jean-Luc Godard. 

For Film und Frau, but also for Stern, Annabelle, Twen and other magazines, Gundlach made fashion and reportage trips to the Near, Middle and Far East as well as to Central and South America. Under an exclusive contract with Brigitte, he photographed more than 160 covers and 5,000 pages of editorial fashion. In the 1970s and 1980s he worked in South America, Africa,  New York and on the American west coast.

Gundlach's retrospective solo exhibitions, such as ModeWelten (1985), Die Pose als Körpersprache (1999), Bilder machen Mode (2004) or F. C. Gundlach. The photographic work (2008) were shown in museums and galleries in Germany and abroad.

Entrepreneur, gallery owner, curator 
Gundlach founded CC (Creative Color GmbH) in 1967 and soon afterwards the photographic service company PPS. (Professional Photo Service) with black and white and colour laboratories, equipment shop, rental studios and a specialist bookshop. In 1975 he expanded the company to include the PPS. Galerie F.C. Gundlach, one of the first pure photo galleries in Germany.

In the PPS. Gallery, Gundlach presented more than 100 exhibitions from 1975 to 1992.  The artists included Irving Penn and Richard Avedon, Joel-Peter Witkin and Robert Mapplethorpe, Martin Kippenberger and Albert Oehlen, Nan Goldin and Wolfgang Tillmans. Since the early 1980s, his attention focused on his collection of photographic works and the conception of photographic exhibitions. Many of these exhibitions consisted completely or in parts of his collection, e.g. Das Medium Fotografie ist berechtigt, Denkanstöße zu geben at the Hamburger Kunstverein 1989, Berlin en Vogue at the Berlinische Galerie 1993, Modebilder, Bildermode / Zeitgeist becomes Form for the Institut für Auslandsbeziehungen (Ifa) 1995, Emotions & Relations at the Kunsthalle Hamburg 1998, Wohin kein Auge reicht at the Deichtorhallen Hamburg 1999 and Mode – Körper – Mode at the Museum für Kunst und Gewerbe Hamburg 2000.

After many years as a lecturer, Gundlach was appointed professor at the Hochschule der Künste Berlin in 1988. As a lobbyist for photography he initiated the Triennial of Photography in Hamburg in 1999.

F. C. Gundlach Foundation and House of Photography 
In order to create a safe haven for his life's work and his extensive photo collection and to enable the active work with his entire photographic legacy, he created the F. C. Gundlach Foundation in 2000. Its purpose is the promotion of art, science and research in the field of photography, in particular the promotion of photography as a cultural asset.

Since September 2003 F. C. Gundlach was founding director of the House of Photography – Deichtorhallen Hamburg, where he installed his collection The Image of Man in Photography as a permanent loan.

The F.C. Gundlach collection The Image of Man in Photography 
The image of man has been topic in photography from the very beginning. The F. C. Gundlach collection attaches special importance to those photographic works that open up new perspectives on human dignity and vulnerability beyond their historical status as visual documents. Photography testifies to the ever-changing visual representation of mankind. A focal point of the collection are therefore photographs that reflect the image of man in his external appearance – in fashions, poses, facial expressions and gestures.

Works of visual artists using photography are of special interest, accentuating the dialogical character of the medium.

Honours and awards 
 Member of the German Society for Photography (DGPh) since 1972, elected to its board in 1976, the Golden Pin of Honour in 1996 and the DGPh Culture Prize in 2001.
 In 1997 Order of Merit of the Federal Republic of Germany.
 In 1998 Golden George Eastman Medal for outstanding services to German photography.
 In 2000 Honorary Professorship of the Hochschule für Bildende Künste Hamburg (HFBK).
 In 2006 the Hamburg Senate awarded him the Medal for Art and Science for his tireless commitment to photography in Hamburg.
 In 2008 honorary citizenship of the community of Alheim/Heinebach.
 In 2011 Hessian Culture Prize.
 In 2012 Henri Nannen Prize for his life's work.

Exhibitions 

Source:

Solo exhibitions 
 1951: F.C. Gundlach. Librairie Jean Robert, Paris
 1986: ModeWelten, Rheinisches Landesmuseum Bonn; 1986 Neue Galerie Kassel; 1986 Hochschule der Künste Berlin; 1987 Museum für Kunst und Gewerbe Hamburg; 1988 Kunstverein Frankfurt am Main; 1988 Fotoforum Bremen; 1988 Kunstverein Erlangen; 1989 Neue Galerie des Joanneums Graz; 1990 Goethe-Institut Paris; 1990 Goethe-Institut Nancy; Marseille, Rotterdam
 1997: Zeitgeist Becomes Form. American Fine Art New York
 1999: Die Pose als Körpersprache, Fotomuseum Braunschweig; 2000 Kunstverein Halle Saale; 2001 Moscow House of Photography; 2001 Staatliche Museen zu Berlin – Kunstbibliothek; 2003 Städtische Galerie Iserlohn
 2001: F. C. Gundlach – A Passion for Photography. Galerie Kicken Berlin
 2004: Sophisticated Lady. Bread & Butter Berlin
 2004: Bilder machen Mode. Neue Galerie des Joanneums Graz
 2004: F. C. Gundlach – Mode und Porträts. focus Galerie Köln
 2005: Die sechziger Jahre. Zephyr – Raum für Fotografie Mannheim
 2005: Wählergunst – Wählerkunst. Die kleine Rache des Souveräns. Hühnerposten Hamburg
 2006: Color. Galerie Kicken Berlin
 2008: F. C. Gundlach. Das fotografische Werk. Haus der Photographie – Deichtorhallen Hamburg
 2009: F. C. Gundlach. Das fotografische Werk. Martin-Gropius-Bau Berlin
 2010: F. C. Gundlach. Das fotografische Werk. Neues Museum Nürnberg
 2011: Berliner Durchreise 2011, Contemporary Fine Arts Berlin
 2011: The Middle East in the 50s and 60s, Sfeir-Semler Gallery Beirut
 2012: F.C. Gundlach. Berlin – Paris. Kulturhaus Osterfeld Pforzheim
 2014: F.C. Gundlach in Brasilien – Mode- und Reportagefotografie. Stadtmuseum Nordhorn
 2014: F.C. Gundlach. Kunsthaus Alte Mühle, Schmallenberg
 2015: On the Wings of Fashion. AbtArt, Stuttgart
 2016: 90 Jahre – 90 Bilder. CFA Galerie Berlin
 2016: Eyes on Paris. Dear Photography, Hamburg
 2018: Around the World in Fashion. Interconti, Düsseldorf

Group exhibitions 
 1975: Fotografie 1929–1975. Württembergischer Kunstverein Stuttgart
 1979: Deutsche Photographie nach ’45. Kunstverein Kassel
 1982: Lichtbildnisse – das Portrait in der Photographie. Rheinisches Landesmuseum Bonn
 1983: Modefotografie der 50er Jahre. PPS. Galerie Hamburg
 1985: Aufbaujahre – 3 Photographen: Fritz Eschen, F. C. Gundlach, Otto Borutta. Berlinische Galerie
 1985: Das Selbstportrait im Zeitalter der Photographie. Musée Cantonal Lausanne
 1985: 50 Jahre moderne Farbphotographie 1936–1986. Photokina Köln
 1993: Berlin en Vogue. Berlinische Galerie; 1993 Museum für Kunst und Gewerbe Hamburg; 1993 Fotomuseum München
 1995: Bildermode – Modebilder. Deutsche Modephotographie 1945–1995. Kunstbibliothek Berlin; 1995 Kunsthalle Bremen; 1996 Corgin Gallery Washington; 1996 Boston Art Institute; 1997 Pat Hearn/Morris Healy Gallery New York; Mailand, Rom, Genua, Tokio, Peking, Seoul, Singapur, Nowosibirsk, Omsk, Petersburg
 1996: Twen. Stadtmuseum München; 1996 Kunsthaus Hamburg, 2002 Ministerio de Educacion, Cultura y Deporte Madrid
 1997: Someone else with my fingerprints. David Zwirner Gallery New York
 1999: Wohin kein Auge reicht. Deichtorhallen Hamburg
 2000: Mode – Körper – Mode. Museum für Kunst und Gewerbe Hamburg
 2001: Botschafterinnen der Mode. Kunstbibliothek Berlin
 2003: Von Körpern und anderen Dingen. City Gallery Prague; 2004 Museum Bochum; 2004 Deutsches Historisches Museum Berlin; 2004 House of Photography Moskau
 2004: Face to Face. Langhans Gallery Prag
 2005: Entrez lentement. Politecnico di Milano
 2005: My private Heroes. MARTa Herford
 2005: Die fünfziger Jahre – Alltagskultur und Design. Museum für Kunst und Gewerbe Hamburg
 2005: Braut Moden Schau. Altonaer Museum Hamburg
 2010: The Heartbeat of Fashion as inspired by F. C. Gundlach. Howard Greenberg Gallery New York
 2010: Fashion. Story of a Lifetime. Empty Quarter Gallery Dubai
 2011: Vanity. Kunsthalle Wien
 2013: Vanity. Muzeum Naradowe, Krakau
 2014: Three. Hagedorn Foundation Gallery, Atlanta
 2014: Steel Ikonen. Automuseum Protoyp, Hamburg
 2015: Das Medium ist berechtigt, Denkanstöße zu geben. CFA Contemporary Fine Arts, Berlin

Publications

Monographs on Gundlachs 
 Klaus Honnef (Ed.): ModeWelten. F. C. Gundlach. Photographien 1950 bis heute. Exhib.-Cat. Rheinisches Landesmuseum Bonn, Berlin 1986.
 Benedikt Taschen Verlag (Ed.): F. C. Gundlach – Fashion Photography 1950–1975. Köln 1989.
 Staatliche Museen zu Berlin (Ed.): F. C. Gundlach – Die Pose als Körpersprache. Exhib.-Cat. Staatliche Museen zu Berlin – Kunstbibliothek, Köln 2001.
 Landesmuseum Joanneum – Bild- und Tonarchiv (Ed.): Bilder machen Mode – F. C. Gundlach. Exhib.-Cat. Landesmuseum Joanneum, Graz 2004.
 Hans-Michael Koetzle, Klaus Honnef, Sebastian Lux und Ulrich Rüter (Ed.): F. C. Gundlach. The photographic Work. Göttingen 2011.

Publications as editor and curator 
 Gundlach, F. C. (Ed.): Vom New Look zum Petticoat. Deutsche Modephotographie der fünfziger Jahre, Berlin 1984.
 Gundlach, F. C. und Kunstverein Hamburg (Ed.): „Das Medium der Fotografie ist berechtigt, Denkanstöße zu geben.“ Die Sammlung F.C. Gundlach. Exhib.-Cat. Kunstverein Hamburg, Hamburg 1989.
 Gundlach, F. C. (Ed.): Zwischenzeiten, Bilder ostdeutscher Photographen. Hamburg, Berlin, Düsseldorf 1991
 Gundlach, F. C. und Uli Richter (Ed.): Berlin en vogue – Berliner Mode in der Photographie. Exhib.-Cat. Berlinische Galerie, Tübingen/Berlin 1993
 Gundlach, F. C. (Concept): Bildermode-Modebilder. Deutsche Modephotographien 1945–1995. Exhib.-Cat. Institut für Auslandsbeziehungen, Stuttgart 1995
 Gundlach, F. C. (Ed.): Das deutsche Auge. 33 Photographen und ihre Reportagen. 33 Blicke auf unser Jahrhundert. Exhib.-Cat. Deichtorhallen Hamburg, Hamburg 1996
 Hamburger Kunsthalle (Ed.): Emotions & Relations. Nan Goldin, David Armstrong, Mark Morrisroe, Jack Pierson und Philip-Lorca diCorcia. Exhib.-Cat. Hamburger Kunsthalle, Hamburg 1998
 Gundlach, F. C. (Ed.): Wohin kein Auge reicht. Von der Entdeckung des Unsichtbaren, Exhib.-Cat. Deichtorhallen Hamburg, Hamburg 1999
 Gundlach, F. C. (Ed.): Mode-Körper-Mode. Photographien eines Jahrhunderts. Dokumente der Photographie 5, Exhib.-Cat. Museum für Kunst und Gewerbe Hamburg, Hamburg 2000
 Gundlach, F. C. (Ed.): Martin Munkácsi. Think while you shoot! Exhib.-Cat. Haus der Photographie – Deichtorhallen Hamburg, Göttingen 2005, 
 Gundlach, F. C. (Ed.): Sworn Virgins, Heidelberg 2013, 
 Museum Folkwang and F.C. Gundlach Foundation (Ed.): Peter Keetman. Gestaltete Welt. Exhib.-Cat. Haus der Photographie – Deichtorhallen Hamburg, Göttingen 2016,

Films 
 F. C. Gundlach – Meister der Modefotografie (2017) – 26 mins, documentary, written and directed by Eva Gerberding; produced by NDR, arte

References

External links 
 
 

1926 births
2021 deaths
20th-century German photographers
Recipients of the Cross of the Order of Merit of the Federal Republic of Germany
Photographers from Hesse